Lincoln Senior High School is a public high school located in Augusta Township, Michigan. Lincoln serves 9-12th grades in the Lincoln Consolidated School District.

Demographics
The demographic breakdown of the 1,157 students enrolled in 2015-2016 was:
Male - 50.9%
Female - 49.1%
Native American/Alaskan - 0.4%
Asian/Pacific islanders - 2.1%
Black - 31.6%
Hispanic - 4.5%
White - 57.0%
Multiracial - 4.4%

41.4% of the students were eligible for free or reduced-cost lunch.

Athletics
The Lincoln Railsplitters compete in the Southeastern Conference.  The school colors are blue and grey.  The following Michigan High School Athletic Association (MHSAA) sanctioned sports are offered:

Baseball (boys)
Basketball (boys and girls)
Competitive cheer (girls)
Cross country (boys and girls)
Football (boys)
Golf (boys and girls)
Lacrosse (boys)
Soccer (boys and girls)
Softball (girls)
Swim and dive (boys and girls)
Tennis (boys and girls)
Track and field (boys and girls)
Boys state tournament runners-up - 1984, 1994
Volleyball (girls)
Wrestling (boys)

Notable alumni
 Victor Roache - baseball player
 Matt Giraud - singer/songwriter
Caleb Foote - TV Actor
Emoni Bates - basketball player
K. J. Osborn - football player
Tyler Mabry - football player
BabyTron - rapper/songwriter

References

External links

Lincoln Consolidated Schools

Public high schools in Michigan
Ypsilanti, Michigan
Educational institutions established in 1924
Schools in Washtenaw County, Michigan
1924 establishments in Michigan